is a Japanese animation studio formed by former Toei Animation members Hideo Furusawa and Megumu Ishiguro, located in Nerima, Tokyo, Japan. The studio was established on July 11, 1973, and has been involved in the production of a large number of anime over the years. Although after the significant commercial success of their adaptations of Koihime Musō and especially YuruYuri, most of their works have been somehow associated with moe or yuri, Doga Kobo is also known for more traditional romantic shows such as Monthly Girls' Nozaki-kun, Plastic Memories, and Tada Never Falls in Love and for slice of life comedy series such as Gabriel DropOut and Himouto! Umaru-chan.

Productions

Television series

OVA/Short series

Films

Notes

References

External links
Official website 

 
Japanese animation studios
Mass media companies established in 1973
Japanese companies established in 1973
Nerima
Animation studios in Tokyo